Sing It Now is an EP by the acoustic pop duo, Poema. It is the debut EP by the group to be released on Tooth & Nail Records.

Track listing

Music videos
"2 AM"

Personnel
Elle Puckett - lead vocals, guitar
Shealeen Puckett - backing vocals, keyboards

References

2010 debut EPs
Poema (musical group) albums
Christian music EPs